Nada Untuk Asa is an Indonesian drama film directed by Charles Gozali released on February 5, 2015. The film stars Marsha Timothy, Acha Septriasa, Darius Sinathriya, Mathias Muchus, Wulan Guritno, Nadilla Ernesta, Irgy Ahmad Fahrezy, Donny Damara, Butet Kartaredjasa, and Pongki Barata.

Gozali was inspired to write the story by an episode of Mata Najwa titled "Hidup Dalam Stigma" that aired in October 2013. The film was nominated for "Favorite Film" at the 2015 Indonesian Movie Awards, but lost to Di Balik 98.

Cast
 Marsha Timothy as Nada
 Acha Septriasa as Asa
 Darius Sinathriya as Wisnu
 Mathias Muchus as Mr. Karno
 Wulan Guritno as Wanda
 Inong Nindya Ayu as Lani
 Irgy Ahmad Fahrezy as Bobby
 Donny Damara as Dr. Arya
 Butet Kartaredjasa as Uncle David
 Tri Budiman as Aunt Nina
 Pongki Barata as himself
 Bayu Oktara as Buyung
 Aurelia Devi Noviaty as Julie
 Bisma Karisma as Student #1
 Sakurta Ginting as Student #2

Awards and nominations

References

External links
 Nada Untuk Asa on Facebook
 Nada Untuk Asa on Twitter

Indonesian drama films